Foley is a surname which originated in Ireland, in the southeast Munster region. The name is derived from the original modern Irish Ó Foghlú and older Irish Ó Foghladha, meaning "plunderer". The Lord of the Decies (the Waterford area of Munster) was a title attributed to some early Foleys.

List of people surnamed Foley 

 Adrian Foley, 8th Baron Foley (1923–2012), British composer
 Alina Foley (2003–present), American actress
 Anthony Foley (1973–2016), Irish rugby player
 Bernard Foley (born 1989), Australian rugby player
 Bill Foley, American photojournalist
 Blaze Foley (1949–1989), American singer
 Brendan Foley (filmmaker), Irish writer-director
 Brendan Foley (rugby union) (born 1950), Irish rugby player
 Brian Foley (disambiguation), several people, including:
 Brian Foley (bishop) (1910–1999), English Roman Catholic bishop of Lancaster
 Brian Foley (footballer) (1933–1998), Australian rules footballer
 Brian Foley (hymnist) (William Brian Foley, 1919–2000), Roman Catholic priest and hymnodist
 Brian Foley (racing driver) (born 1932) Australian racecar driver
 Brian X. Foley (born 1957), American politician in the New York State Senate
 Brian Foley, American healthcare magnate and husband of Lisa Wilson-Foley
 C. Fritz Foley, American economist 
 Caroline Augusta Foley Rhys Davids (1857–1942), English scholar and translator
 Charles Foley (disambiguation), several people, including
 Charles Foley (footballer) (1856–1933), played in three FA Cup Finals for Old Etonians F.C.
 Charles Foley (inventor) (1931–2013), invented the game Twister, together with Neil W. Rabens
 Charles Foley (journalist) (born 1909), Indian-born British journalist
 Charles F. Foley, American lawyer and politician
 Chris Foley (disambiguation), several people, including
 Chris Foley (politician) (born 1956), independent member of the Queensland Legislative Assembly
 Chris Foley (musician), drummer for Boston hardcore bands SSD and DYS
 Chris Foley (born 1974), radio show host, known as Kidd Chris
 Cornelia MacIntyre Foley, American/Hawaiian artist
 Curry Foley, early Irish baseball player
 Cyril Foley (1868–1936), English cricketer, military officer and archaeologist
 Dave Foley, Canadian actor
 David Foley, English professional footballer
 David Edward Foley (1930–2018), American Roman Catholic bishop
 Denis Foley (1934–2013), Irish politician
 Des Foley, Irish sportsman and politician
 Dominic Foley, Irish professional footballer
 Ellen Foley, American singer and actress
 Fiona Foley, Australian artist
 Francis B. Foley. (1887–1973), American ferrous metallurgist.
 Frank Foley, British spy against the Nazi regime in Germany
 Frederick Foley, American physician, designer of Foley Catheter
 Gaelen Foley (born 1973), American writer
 Gary Foley (born 1950), Australian activist and academic
 Gerry Foley (1932–2021), American-born Canadian professional ice hockey player
 Glenn Foley (born 1970), American football player
 Henry Foley (disambiguation), several people, including
 Henry Foley (English cricketer) (1905–1959), left-hand bat for Worcestershire
 Henry Foley (historian) (1811–1891), English Jesuit church historian
 Henry Foley (New Zealand cricketer) (1906–1948), left-hand bat for Wellington
 Henry Foley, 5th Baron Foley (1850–1905), British peer
 Henry Foley (1917–1985), English man killed in police custody
 Henry M. Foley (1918–1982), American experimental physicist
 Jack Foley (disambiguation), several people
 Jack Foley (basketball) (born 1939), American basketball player
 Jack Foley (poet) (born 1940), American poet
 Jack Foley (sound effects artist) (1891–1967), pioneering American sound effects specialist
 James Foley (disambiguation), several people, including
 James Foley (bishop) (born 1948), Australian Roman Catholic bishop
 James Foley (cricketer) (1898–1969), Irish cricketer
 James Foley (director) (born 1953), American film director and screenwriter
 James Foley (journalist) (1973–2014), American journalist, beheaded by ISIL in 2014
 James A. Foley (1882–1946), American lawyer and politician from New York
 James Bradford Foley (1807–1886), United States Representative from Indiana
 James Brendan Foley (born 1957), U.S. diplomat
 James D. Foley (born 1942), American university professor in the field of human-computer interaction
 James L. Foley Jr. (1885–?), American politician and farmer
 James Thomas Foley (1910–1990), American judge
 Jason Foley (born 1995), American baseball player
 Jessica Foley (born 1983), Australian basketball player
 Jim Foley (born 1946), Canadian football player
 Joe Foley (born 1955), American women's basketball coach
 John Foley (disambiguation), several people, including
 John Foley (author) (1917–1974), British soldier and author
 Sir John Foley (British Army officer, born 1939), Chief of Defence Intelligence, Lieut.-Governor of Guernsey
 John Foley (Bushranger)
 John Foley (Jesuit) (born 1939), Jesuit priest and songwriter of Catholic liturgical music
 John Foley (Monsignor) (1854–1937), priest, educator and President of Carlow College
 John Foley (American football), American college football linebacker
 John Foley (baseball) (1857–?), baseball player
 John Foley (rugby league), rugby league footballer of the 1900s, and 1910s for Wales, and Ebbw Vale
 John Foley (rugby union) (born 1997), Irish rugby union player
 John D. Foley (1918–1999), American bomber gunner in World War II
 John H. Foley (1839–1874), American soldier and Medal of Honor recipient
 John Henry Foley (1818–1874), Irish sculptor
 John Miles Foley (1947–2012), folklorist
 John P. Foley (judge) (died 1984), Presiding Judge of the Wisconsin Court of Appeals
 John Patrick Foley (1935–2011), Roman Catholic cardinal
 John R. Foley (1917–2001), U.S. Congressman from Maryland, 1959–1961
 John Samuel Foley (1833–1918), Catholic bishop of Detroit, namesake of Bishop Foley High School
 Joseph Foley (born 1821), Irish solicitor and nationalist politician
 Joseph P. Foley, Canadian politician
 Kevin Foley (disambiguation), several people, including
 Kevin Foley (drummer) (born 1988), drummer
 Kevin Foley (footballer) (born 1984), footballer
Kevin J. Foley(Metro Detroit Area) College Baseball Player and Coach (NAIA)
 Kevin Foley (Gaelic footballer), Irish Gaelic footballer playing for County Meath
 Kevin Foley (golfer) (born 1987), American golfer
 Kevin Foley (South Australian politician) (born 1960), South Australian politician
 Kevin Foley (Victorian politician) (born 1938), politician and academic
 Laurence Foley, American diplomat
 Lelia Foley, first African-American woman elected mayor in United States
 Leo Foley, Minnesota politician and state senator
 Linda Foley, American journalist and labor leader
 Louise Munro Foley, American writer
Lucy Foley, American Author
 Luke Foley, Australian politician
 Mark Foley (born 1954), US congressman from Florida
 Mark Foley (Cork hurler), Irish hurler
 Mark Foley (Limerick hurler), Irish hurler
 Martin Foley, Irish criminal
 Margaret Foley (1827–1877), American sculptor
 Margaret Foley (suffragist) (1875–1957), Irish-American labor organizer, suffragist, and social worker
 Maurice Foley (disambiguation), several people, including
 Maurice Foley (sportsman) (1930–2013), Australian cricketer and field hockey player
 Maurice Foley (politician) (1925–2002), British Labour politician
 Maurice B. Foley (born 1960), Chief Judge of the United States Tax Court
 Mick Foley (born 1965), American professional wrestler 
 Michael Foley (disambiguation), several people, including
 Michael Foley (academic) (born 1948), international relations scholar
 Michael Foley (American football) (born 1955), American football coach at Colgate University
 Michael Foley (cricketer) (1844–1904), New Zealand cricketer
 Michael Foley (cyclist) (born 1999), Canadian cyclist
 Michael Foley (Kildare footballer), Irish Gaelic footballer
 Michael Foley (Leitrim footballer), Irish Gaelic footballer
 Michael Foley (Ohio politician) (born 1963), Ohio (U.S.) politician
 Michael Foley (rugby union) (born 1967), Australian rugby player
 Michael Hamilton Foley (1820–1870), Canadian politician
 Michael W. Foley (born 1964), American electrical engineer
 Mick Foley (born 1965), American professional wrestler
 Mick Foley (footballer) (born 1892), Irish footballer
 Mick Foley (public servant) (1923–1975), Australian public servant
 Mike Foley (Australian politician) (born 1946), Tasmanian politician
 Mike Foley (Nebraska politician) (born 1954), Nebraska (U.S.) politician
 Nathan Foley (disambiguation), several people
 Nathan Foley (footballer), Australian Rules Footballer
 Nathan Foley (performer), in children's group Hi-5
 Norma Foley (born 1970), Irish politician 
 Pat Foley, sports broadcaster 
 Patrick Foley (drummer), drummer for As It Is (band)
 Patrick Foley (1858–1926), Roman Catholic professor, priest and Bishop of Kildare and Leighlin
 Paul Foley (disambiguation), several people
 Philip Foley, British ironmaster and politician
 Red Foley (1910–1968), American country music singer, musician
 Richard Foley (disambiguation), several people, including:
 Richard Foley (ironmaster) (1580–1657), English ironmaster
 Richard Foley (politician) (1681–1732), English lawyer and MP for Droitwich
 Richard T. Foley, discoverer of the Richard T. Foley Site, an archaeological site
 Richie Foley, Irish hurler
 Rick Foley, Canadian ice hockey player
 Robert Foley (disambiguation), several people including:
 Robert Foley (academic) (born 1953), British anthropologist and archaeologist
 Robert Foley (American politician) (born 1953), politician from Maine
 Robert Foley (footballer) (born 1946), Ghanaian footballer
 Robert Foley (ironmonger) (1624–1676), English ironmonger and High Sheriff
 Robert Foley (priest) (died 1783), Dean of Worcester Cathedral
 Robert Foley (MP) (1651–1702), English politician
 Robert F. Foley (born 1941), Medal of Honor recipient
 Sylvester R. Foley Jr. (born 1928), known as Bob, American admiral
 Sallie Foley, American psychotherapist
 Samuel Foley (bishop) (1655–1695), bishop of Down and Connor
 Samuel J. Foley (politician) (1862–1922), New York politician
 Samuel J. Foley (district attorney) (1891–1951), Bronx County district attorney
 Scott Foley, American actor
 Sean Reid-Foley, American baseball player
 Stephan A. Foley, American judge, namesake for Stephan A. Foley House in Lincoln, Illinois
 Steve Foley (disambiguation), several people, including:
 Steve Foley (defensive back) (born 1953), American football player for the Denver Broncos
 Steve Foley (diver) (born 1957), Australian Olympic diver and diving coach
 Steve Foley (drummer) (1959–2008), drummer for The Replacements
 Steve Foley (footballer, born 1953), English association football coach
 Steve Foley (footballer, born 1962), English association football player
 Steve Foley (linebacker) (born 1975), American football player for the Cincinnati Bengals, Houston Texans and San Diego Chargers
 Steve Foley (Australian footballer) (1902–1948), Australian rules footballer with Fitzroy
 Steven Foley-Sheridan (born 1986), Irish soccer player
 Sue Foley, Canadian blues musician
 Theo Foley, Irish footballer and football manager
 Theodore Foley, Roman Catholic priest
 Thomas Foley (disambiguation), several people, including:
 Thomas Foley, journalist and friend of Ian Holbourn, who married RMS Lusitania survivor Avis Dolphin
 Thomas Foley (Australian politician) (1853–1920), member of the Queensland Legislative Assembly
 Thomas F. "Big Tom" Foley (1852–1925), American Tammany Hall politician
 Thomas Foley (Royal Navy officer) (1757–1833), British admiral
 Thomas C. Foley (born 1952), American diplomat
 Thomas Patrick Roger Foley (1822–1879), American religious leader
 Victoria Foley, American politician from Maine
The Barons Foley and family
 Thomas Foley (died 1677) (1616–1677), British ironmaster, builder of Witley Court estate, member of Parliament for Bewdley
 Thomas Foley (died 1701) (–1701), son of previous, member of Parliament for Worcestershire, and then Droitwich
 Thomas Foley, 1st Baron Foley (1673–1733), son of previous, member of Parliament for Stafford, and then Droitwich
 Thomas Foley, 2nd Baron Foley (1703–1766), son of previous, never married, rebuilt  parish church of Great Witley
 Thomas Foley (auditor of the imprests) (c. 1670 – 1737), MP for Weobly, then Hereford, then Stafford
 Thomas Foley (died 1749) (–1749), son of previous, MP for Hereford, then Herefordshire
 Thomas Foley, 1st Baron Foley (1716–1777), son of previous, MP for Droitwich, then Herefordshire
 Thomas Foley, 2nd Baron Foley (1742–1793), son of previous, MP for Herefordshire, then Droitwich
 Thomas Foley, 3rd Baron Foley (1780–1833), son of previous, MP and Captain of the Honourable Corps of Gentlemen-at-Arms
 Thomas Foley, 4th Baron Foley (1808–1869), son of previous, MP for Worcestershire and Captain of the Honourable Corps of Gentlemen-at-Arms
 Thomas Foley (1778–1822), grandson of the first baron, MP for Herefordshire and Droitwich
 Thos Foley, Irish snow skier, not a water-skier
 Tom Foley (1929–2013), Speaker of the United States House of Representatives
 Tom Foley (Australian politician) (1886–1973), Member of the Queensland Legislative Assembly
 Tom Foley (infielder), baseball player and coach of the 1980s, 1990s, and 2000s
 Tom Foley (outfielder) (1847–1896), American baseball player
 Tom Foley (Pennsylvania) (born 1953), politician from Pennsylvania who became President of Mount Aloysius College
 Will Foley (footballer) (born 1960), Scottish footballer
 William Foley (disambiguation), several people, including
 William Foley (American football), American football coach
 William Foley (artist) (1926–2020), American artist
 William Foley (bishop) (1931–1991), Australian bishop and Archbishop
 William A. Foley (born 1949), American linguist
 William Brown Foley (1855–1916), baseball player
 William R. Foley (1908–1988), American politician
 William P. Foley II (born 1944), American businessman; chairman of Fidelity National Financial and owner of the Vegas Golden Knights
 William Brian Foley (1919–2000), known as Brian Foley (hymnist), Roman Catholic priest and hymnodist
 William J. Foley (1887–1952), American attorney and politician
 William Foley (priest) (1854–1944), Archdeacon of Ardfert 
 Zac Foley (1970–2002), bassist for EMF (band)

Fictional characters
 Justin Foley, a character in the novel and Netflix series 13 Reasons Why
 Tucker Foley, one of the main characters of Danny Phantom
 Axel Foley, the main character in the Beverly Hills Cop franchise
 Richie Foley, aka Gear, from Static Shock

See also
 Foley baronets, extinct British baronetcy
 Baron Foley, British peerage title
 Foley (disambiguation)
 Axel Foley, fictitious character played by Eddie Murphy
 Matt Foley, fictional character from Saturday Night Live

English-language surnames
Anglicised Irish-language surnames
Surnames of Irish origin